Route 13 is a highway in Missouri which runs almost the entire north–south length of the state.  Its northern terminus is at U.S. Route 69/136 in Bethany.  Its southern terminus is at the Arkansas state line in downtown Blue Eye, Missouri–Arkansas where it continues as Highway 21.  It is one of the original state highways of Missouri.

The road serves as an important corridor between Springfield and Kansas City, two of the three largest cities in the state.  Heading north from Springfield, Route 13 intersects Route 7 at Clinton which in turn carries traffic to Interstate 49/U.S. Route 71 at Harrisonville.  I-49/US 71 then continues on into downtown Kansas City.  Route 13, Route 7, and I-49/US 71 now provide a four-lane highway (much of it freeway) between Springfield and Kansas City since the completion of the final widening project between Collins and Clinton.

Several sections from north of Reeds Spring through Branson West have been widened, rebuilt, moved, and renamed to help ease traffic congestion through the towns. Drivers regularly use these routes to get to many of the lakes in southern Missouri and this has caused a major headache in recent years. One section of road has been renamed Route 413 and travels north to Springfield. In June 2009, the nation's first diverging diamond interchange, a style of interchange where traffic crosses to the left-side of the road, opened to traffic. The interchange is located at the I-44/MO-13 junction in Springfield.

In 2006 the portion through Caldwell County, Missouri was named the Zack Wheat Memorial Highway in honor of the Baseball Hall of Fame player.

Route description

Route 13 begins at the Arkansas state line in Blue Eye. After leaving the town, it travels through the rugged countryside of the southwest Missouri Ozarks, part of the Mark Twain National Forest. Route 13 forms a  concurrency with Route 86 before bridging Table Rock Lake south of the town of Kimberling City. In Branson West, it leaves the national forest and forms a concurrency with Route 76 and Route 265. At Reeds Spring Junction is the southern terminus of Route 413, and old alignment of Route 13, changed in the early 2000s. Also at Reeds Spring Junction, U.S. Route 160 (US 160) joins to form another concurrency with Route 13. At Spokane, the two highways are joined by a third, Route 176.

US 160 and Route 13 intersect Route 14 in Nixa. The two highways continue north into Greene County, where they enter Springfield traveling along Campbell Avenue. At the James River Freeway, US 160 and Route 13 turn off Campbell to travel along the freeway with US 60. Route 13 splits off the freeway at the next exit to turn north along Kansas Expressway. At Sunshine Street is the northern terminus of Route 413. It then passes near the Ozark Empire Fairgrounds and the Dickerson Park Zoo and leaves the city as a divided highway. A project begun in 2009 and completed on June 21 of that year, turned the existing I-44 interchange into a diverging diamond, which was the first of its kind in the nation. In addition to costing $2.5 million compared to around $8 million for a complete rebuild, this has also helped ease congestion at the interchange by making lefts onto the on-ramps "free lefts" by lanes shifting into opposite lanes when passing over the bridge.

South of Bolivar, the divided highway splits apart, with the northbound lanes being the older highway, though an even older alignment travels further to the east.  Because of the situation, numerous "Do not enter" signs are posted to help prevent local traffic from driving on the wrong lanes of the highway. Near Brighton is a short concurrency with Route 215. Construction began in summer of 2008 to build new northbound lanes next to the straighter southbound lanes. This project was completed in 2010 and the old northbound lanes will be designated county roads when the project is completed.

At Bolivar, in addition to the intersection with Route 32, is another business route. The business route ends, along with Route 83 at an interchange on the southern part of the town. South of Humansville is the intersection with Route 123. At Collins is an interchange with US 54. At Osceola, Route 13 crosses a branch of the Harry S. Truman Reservoir.

At Deepwater, Route 13 forms a concurrency with Route 52. The two highways cross Harry S. Truman Reservoir twice before heading into Clinton. Route 13 and Route 52 serve as the eastern terminus of Route 18. Route 7 joins the concurrency at the same intersection, and the three highways continue around the northeastern part of the town, where Route 52 splits off, and eventually Route 7 and Route 13 go their separate ways.

North of Post Oak, the highway has an intersection with Route 2. East of Warrensburg is an intersection with US 50. South of Higginsville, Route 13 crosses I-70/US 40. At Higginsville is the western terminus of Route 20.

Route 13 then forms a complicated interchange with US 24 and Route 224 east of Lexington, the site of a Civil War battlefield, then crosses the Missouri River. From US 24 in Lexington to the intersection with Route 10 in Richmond, the highway is a four-lane limited access road. North of Richmond, it returns to a two-lane highway flanked by crop land. At Polo the road forms a short concurrency with Route 116, and further north, at Hamilton is an intersection with US 36. A few miles north is an interchange with I-35. Then, Route 13 ends at US 69/US 136 in Bethany.

History
The original southern terminus of the highway (as laid out in 1922) was at Route 71 (now U.S. Route 65) in Buffalo. By 1925, it was realigned to absorb the Bolivar-Springfield Route 69, which had been created in 1922; the former piece from Bolivar to Buffalo became an extension of Route 66, which became part of US 54 in 1927 (and is now part of Route 32). Route 13 took over Route 43, established in 1922 from Marionville south to the Arkansas state line, in about 1930.

Route 123 is the old alignment of Route 13 between Humansville and Fair Play, where Route 13 turned east on to what is now Route 32 (Route 64 prior to 1956) back to Bolivar.

Route 13 Business 

 Richmond
 Lexington
 Higginsville
 Warrensburg
 Clinton
 Osceola
 Collins
 Bolivar
 Branson West

Major intersections

References

013
Transportation in Stone County, Missouri
Transportation in Christian County, Missouri
Transportation in Greene County, Missouri
Transportation in Polk County, Missouri
Transportation in St. Clair County, Missouri
Transportation in Henry County, Missouri
Transportation in Johnson County, Missouri
Transportation in Lafayette County, Missouri
Transportation in Ray County, Missouri
Transportation in Caldwell County, Missouri
Transportation in Daviess County, Missouri
Transportation in Harrison County, Missouri